In the Tradition may refer to:
 In the Tradition (Alan Silva, Johannes Bauer, and Roger Turner album), 1996
 In the Tradition (Anthony Braxton album), 1974
 In the Tradition Volume 2, Anthony Braxton album recorded in 1974 and released in 1977
 In the Tradition (Arthur Blythe album), 1978
 In the Tradition (Dave Van Ronk album), 1964